The Leelanau Peninsula is a peninsula of the U.S. state of Michigan that extends about  from the western side of the Lower Peninsula of Michigan into Lake Michigan. Leelanau County encompasses the entire peninsula. It is often referred to as the "little finger" of the mitten-shaped lower peninsula.

Geography
The peninsula forms the western shore of the Grand Traverse Bay.

Lake Michigan forms the western coast of the peninsula. The southernmost section of the peninsula is flanked by the Sleeping Bear Dunes National Lakeshore. Leelanau State Park and the Grand Traverse Light are located at the northern tip. Traverse City, the largest municipality in Northern Michigan, is located at the base of the peninsula on the east side, at the head of Grand Traverse Bay. The North and South Manitou Islands are located to the northwest of the peninsula in Lake Michigan. Lake Leelanau runs  through the eastern half of the peninsula, almost completely dividing the Leelanau Peninsula in two sections. At the eponymous community, Lake Leelanau narrows and is crossed by M-204. Glen Lake is another large lake located within the southwest of the peninsula.

East of the Leelanau Peninsula is the smaller Old Mission Peninsula.

M-22 is a famous highway that runs along the coast of the Leelanau Peninsula, as well as further south down Lake Michigan. M-72 and M-204 are other highways that cross the Leelanau Peninsula west–east; M-72 runs across the base of the peninsula from Empire to Traverse City, while M-204 crosses roughly halfway up the peninsula, from Leland to Suttons Bay via Lake Leelanau. Another highway, US 31 between Beulah and Chums Corner, runs perpendicular to M-72 and M-204, although it lies a few miles south of the base of the Leelanau Peninsula.

The Leelanau Peninsula is known for its unusually steep terrain and large bodies of water, both of which produce a milder microclimate than the more temperate areas further inland. Some of the area was developed for agricultural purposes and annual festivals related to the cherry crop have been held in Traverse City since 1925. 

In the early 21st century, the Leelanau Peninsula AVA is known as one of the best Michigan wine regions and is a designated American Viticultural Area (AVA).  The peninsula is also a productive fruit region growing apples and tart cherries.

Communities 
Communities on the Leelanau Peninsula include:
Northport Point
Northport
Omena
Leland
Peshawbestown
Suttons Bay
Lake Leelanau
Glen Arbor
Glen Haven
Empire
Greilickville
Maple City
Cedar
The northwesternmost neighborhoods and suburbs of Traverse City 
The Grand Traverse Band of Ottawa & Chippewa are a group of Native Americans who live on the peninsula around Peshawbestown, Michigan. Their ancestors were among the Algonquian-speaking tribes that largely occupied this area prior to European colonization.

History 
Leelanau County was set off in 1840 and organized in 1863.

The first railroads on the peninsula were built in 1892. Additional railroads would snake up the peninsula with lines from Lake Ann and Traverse City to Provemont, Suttons Bay, and Northport. The last railroad on the peninsula, from Traverse City to Northport via Suttons Bay, was removed in 1996. It was subsequently replaced with the Leelanau Trail, a  recreational rail trail.

The Sleeping Bear Dunes National Lakeshore, the most renowned part of the peninsula, was authorized on October 21, 1970. The park's creation was controversial because it involved the transfer of private property to public ownership. The federal government's stance at the time was that the Great Lakes were the "third coast" and had to be preserved much like Cape Hatteras or Point Reyes, which are National Seashores.

Etymology 
Native Americans who first inhabited the area called this land "ke-ski-bi-ag," which means "narrow body of water." 

"Leelanau" was traditionally said to be a Native American word meaning "delight of life," but the name was more likely invented by Henry Rowe Schoolcraft, the United States Indian agent for the territory in the early 19th century, or his wife Jane Johnston Schoolcraft. Henry also used the name Leelinau for a character in his writing. Jane was the daughter of a prominent Scots-Irish Canadian fur trader and an Ojibwe chief's daughter based in Sault Ste. Marie, Ontario and Michigan, and Henry learned about the Ojibwe (or Chippewa) through his wife's and mother-in-law's family. See Leelanau County for a more complete discussion of the etymology of the name.

Scholars have established, however, that Jane first used Leelinau as a pen name for her writings in The Literary Voyager, a family magazine which she and her husband wrote together and circulated among friends in the 1820s.  She and her siblings were well-educated and she wrote in Ojibwe and English.  

While her writing was not published formally in her lifetime (except as her husband appropriated it under his own name), since the late 20th century Jane Johnston Schoolcraft has been recognized as "the first Native American literary writer, the first known Indian woman writer, the first known Indian poet, the first known poet to write poems in a Native American language, and the first known American Indian to write out traditional Indian stories." In 2008 Jane Johnston Schoolcraft was inducted into the Michigan Women's Hall of Fame.

Points of interest
Fishtown, Michigan
Fountain Point
Port Oneida Rural Historic District
Sleeping Bear Dunes National Lakeshore

References

External links

Leland Report
Leelanau.com
Northport - Omena Chamber of Commerce
Leelanau Township Website
Leelanau Township Library Website

Landforms of Leelanau County, Michigan
Peninsulas of Michigan